Jorge Bernal Alarcón (born October 24, 1979) is a Mexican former footballer who last played as a goalkeeper with Delfines F.C.

Club career
He made his professional debut for Veracruz on 27 August 2003 against C.F. Monterrey, immediately saving a Luis Ernesto Pérez penalty. Shortly after, Bernal became the first choice goalkeeper for Veracruz.

After five seasons with Veracruz, Club San Luis obtained his rights in the 2008 Apertura draft.  However, the club didn't register him, and he didn't play until the next season when he was transferred to Club Necaxa. The following season, Bernal returned to Veracruz now playing in the second division.

References

External links
 

1979 births
Living people
People from Veracruz (city)
Footballers from Veracruz
Association football goalkeepers
Mexican footballers
C.D. Veracruz footballers
Club Necaxa footballers
San Luis F.C. players
Querétaro F.C. footballers